Patiently Waiting may refer to:

Patiently Waiting, album by Joanna Beasley 2009 
Patiently Waiting, album by Social Code 2001
 "Patiently Waiting", song by singer Kathy Mattea, written by Gillian Welch, from Love Travels
 "Patiently Waiting", song by Mac Dre, Chop Da Hookman, Young Los & Mistah F.A.B. from Dre Area
 "Patiently Waiting", song by 50 Cent from Get Rich or Die Tryin'